The St Edwards Bears are an Australian junior rugby league football club associated with St Edward's College, East Gosford, on the Central Coast of NSW. They have numerous teams competing in competitions run by the Central Coast Division of Country Rugby League, from Under 7s through to Under 16s. Since 2013, the club has also fielded a team in the senior, Open Age competition. The Bears play their home matches on the grounds of the college. Their traditional colours are red and black.

St Edwards won the junior club championship in their second year, 1971, and the following three seasons.

Honours and records

Team
 Junior Club Champions (7): 1971, 1972, 1973, 1974, 2014, 2018, 2019
 Under 16 (2): 1994, 1997.
 Under 16 Division 2 (1): 2005
Under 10 Division 3 (1): 2014
Under 14 Division 3 (1): 2018
Under 15 Division 3 (1): 2019

Team Numbers

Team numbers obtained and compiled from competition tables and match results published in the newspapers, Central Coast Express, Wyong Shire Advocate and Central Coast Express Advocate. Numbers for 2003 and 2011 taken from copies of the Central Coast Division Junior Rugby League Yearbook of those years, supplied by Toukley Hawks RLFC. Age groups Under 9 and younger not included as team numbers from 1985 to 2011 not known to the author.

See also

 List of NSW Central Coast Rugby League First Grade Premiers

References

Rugby league teams in New South Wales
Sport on the Central Coast (New South Wales)
Rugby clubs established in 1970
1970 establishments in Australia